X-Wars was a massively multiplayer browser game, in which thousands of players interact in realtime. It contains elements of real-time strategy and construction and management simulation.

The player colonizes and develops planets, designs, builds and commands starships as well as trades, allies and battles with other players.

The game has become popular in the early stages of massively multiplayer browser games from 2002 in Germany, mainly for its complexity and innovative features. Later it has been released internationally in six languages.

X-Wars won the "Superbrowsergame Gold Award" of 2005 in the category of the largest games (more than 20,000 players). This prize had been the most prominent massively multiplayer browser specific game contest at the time and was awarded after several voting rounds including communities and an expert committee. The developers were then invited to the Giga Games TV show (NBC).

The popular German mainstream computer magazine c't awarded it the best free browsergame. The German gaming magazine PC Action rated it 90%, which has been the best rating.

Details 
The game offers a deep complexity with many fractions, technology dependencies and interaction possibilities which were innovative at the time of introduction.

In particular, the possibility of designing own starship types with own names from a broad range of components contributed to the game's complexity and popularity and the distinction in comparison to other games. As a result, the X-Wars universe is populated by thousands of different starship types which try to gain strategic advantages in battles.

History 
The game has been developed by Sebastian Lagemann and Nils Mitoussis from 2002 and has been published initially in German language. Gamigo published the game in Germany, Switzerland and Austria. Later, it was licensed internationally to Gameforge. French, English, Polish, Spanish and Portuguese versions have been released. In 2007, Mediatainment acquired X-Wars and continued game development and operation.

The game went offline in April 2012. It is unknown whether operations will continue in the future.

References

External links 
 Official English X-Wars website
 International X-Wars website (from Archive; domain was re-sold)
 Mediatainment GmbH website (German)

2002 video games
Browser games
German games
Online games
Massively multiplayer online real-time strategy games
Space massively multiplayer online role-playing games
Browser-based multiplayer online games
Inactive massively multiplayer online games
Video games developed in Germany
Gamigo games
Gameforge games